Saint Spyridon Church may refer to:

Saint Spyridon Church, Corfu, Greece
Saint Spyridon Church, Trieste, Italy
Saint Spyridon Church, Focșani, Romania 
Saint Spyridon Church, Iași, Romania
Saint Spyridon the New Church, Bucharest, Romania
St. Spyridon's Church, Vuno, Albania
St. Spyridon Parish of South East Sydney, New South Wales, Australia
St. Spyridon Church, Peroj, Croatia
St. Spyridon Greek Orthodox Church, Manhattan, United States

See also
St Spyridon College, Sydney, New South wales, Australia